Decoud or DeCoud is a surname.  Notable people with the surname include:

 Sebastián Decoud (born 1981), Argentine tennis player
 Thomas DeCoud (born 1985), American football player
 Treston Decoud (born 1993), American football player